Christopher Simms Jr. (born February 6, 1998), known by his stage name Cico P (formerly "Cicoeee P"), is an American rapper, singer, and songwriter.

Life and career 
Cico P hails from Jacksonville, Texas. His recent single, "Tampa" has achieved viral popularity on TikTok in early 2021. "Tampa" catapulted Cico P to the top of the US Spotify Viral 50 chart as well as the #3 spot on Rolling Stone’s Breakthrough 25 and #41 on Billboard’s Emerging Artists.

References

Living people
1998 births
Musicians from Texas
American male rappers
African-American male rappers
Southern hip hop musicians
21st-century American rappers
Rappers from Texas
People from Jacksonville, Texas
21st-century American male musicians
21st-century African-American musicians